McNair is a surname.

McNair may also refer to:

Places

United States
McNair, Arkansas, an unincorporated community
McNair, Minnesota, an unincorporated community
McNair, Texas, an unincorporated community
McNair, Virginia, a census-designated place

Elsewhere
McNair Nunatak, Mac. Robertson Land, Antarctica
McNair (crater), a lunar impact crater
3354 McNair, an asteroid
Mount McNair, a mountain in Canada

Other uses
McNair Barracks, a former US Army installation in Berlin, Germany
McNair Field, a baseball stadium in Forest City, North Carolina
Baron McNair, a British peerage title
, a US Navy destroyer

See also
Fort Lesley J. McNair
Matthew McNair Secondary School, British Columbia, Canada
McNair High School (disambiguation)
McNeir (disambiguation)